The Needle Mountains are a subrange of the San Juan Mountains of the Rocky Mountains located in the southwestern part of the U.S. State of Colorado. Much of the range is protected in the Weminuche Wilderness of the San Juan National Forest.  The range is notable for having some of the most rugged mountains in the state, and includes many technical climbs and scrambles.  A small but dramatic east–west subrange in the northern section is known as the Grenadier Range.

Geology
Unlike the rest of the San Juan Mountains, which are volcanic in origin, the Needle Mountains (along with the Grenadier Range) are a mass of uplifted Precambrian rocks. They consist chiefly of quartzite, granite, and amphibolite. The mountains are referred to as the Needle Mountains Uplift.

Notable peaks
 Mount Eolus, 14,089 ft
 Windom Peak, 14,082 ft
 Sunlight Peak, 14,059 ft
 Pigeon Peak, 13,972 ft
 Vestal Peak, 13,864 ft (Grenadier Range)
 Turret Peak, 13,835 ft
 Jagged Mountain, 13,824 ft
 Arrow Peak, 13,803 ft (Grenadier Range)
 Animas Mountain, 13,786 ft
 Storm King Peak, 13,752 ft (Grenadier Range)
 Mount Silex, 13,628 ft
 The Guardian (Colorado), 13,617 ft
 Leviathan Peak, 13,528 ft
 Vallecito Mountain, 13,428 ft
 Mount Garfield, 13,074 ft

References

San Juan Mountains (Colorado)
Mountain ranges of Colorado
Ranges of the Rocky Mountains
Landforms of La Plata County, Colorado
Landforms of San Juan County, Colorado
San Juan National Forest